D. hastata may refer to:
 Dasyatis hastata, the groovebelly stingray, a fish species
 Dysosmia hastata, a synonym for Passiflora foetida, the foetid passion flower or stinking passion flower

See also
 Hastata (disambiguation)